Renaissance Cruises was a cruise ship operating company that was founded in 1989 and  owned by Fearnley & Eger Rederi in Oslo, Norway. It was purchased by Edward Rudner (founder of Alamo Car Rental) as the company faltered during the Gulf War. It operated year-round cruise itineraries to the Mediterranean Sea, the Greek Isles, Tahiti and the South Pacific, northern Europe and Scandinavia. The company ceased operations on 25 September 2001, having accommodated up to 220,000 guests in 2000. While the company had been in poor financial health for quite some time, the economic decline resulting from the September 11 attacks in 2001 is credited with the demise of this cruise line. It was headquartered in Fort Lauderdale, Florida.

Fleet

Renaissance class
The company also owned and operated eight Renaissance-class yacht-like ships between 1989 and 1992. The first four of them were built in Cantieri Navale Ferrari-Signani shipyards in La Spezia, Italy, from 1989 to 1991. The other four were built in Nuovi Cantieri Apuania shipyards in Carrara, Italy, in the same period. The small, intimately sized vessels used Roman numeral designations as part of their names: Renaissance I through Renaissance VIII.

These are the current names, former names and registries of the Renaissance-class ships;
Renaissance I, Renaissance III, Renaissance IV, and Renaissance VIII were all chartered and sold in 1998 so the line could concentrate on the larger, newer R class. Before the line folded for the R class, Renaissance V, Renaissance VI, and Renaissance VII were sold to other interests. Renaissance II was renamed Neptune II In 1998 for operations in Singapore before EasyCruise was formed. Current operators of these vessels include Noble-Caledonia, Silversea, and Antarctica XXI.

Renaissance class I 
Built at Cantieri Navale Ferrari-Signani shipyard (1989–1991):

Renaissance class II 
Built at Nuovi Cantieri Apuania shipyard (1991–1992):

R class 
The ships in this class were all built between 1998 and 2001. They were all built at the shipyard of Chantiers de l'Atlantique in Saint-Nazaire France and were designed, internally and externally, by British Designer John McNeece. Following the bankruptcy of Renaissance Cruises, all of the vessels were chartered or sold to other cruise lines and continue to operate to this day.

References

External links
Renaissance Cruises (Archive)

Defunct cruise lines
Defunct shipping companies
Hospitality companies established in 1989
Hospitality companies disestablished in 2001